The Long Road Home is a 2005 album by John Fogerty.

The Long Road Home may also refer to:

Film and television
 Long Road Home (film), a 1991 American television film directed by John Korty
 The Long Road Home (film), a 1999 American television film directed by Craig Clyde
 The Long Road Home (miniseries), a 2017 National Geographic Channel docudrama/miniseries
 "The Long Road Home" (Arthur), a television episode

Literature
 The Long Road Home (novel), a 1998 novel by Danielle Steel
 The Dark Tower: The Long Road Home, a 2008 monthly five-issue comic book mini-series
 The Long Road Home: A Story of War and Family, a 2006 book by Martha Raddatz

Music
 The Long Road Home – In Concert, a 2006 DVD and double live album by John Fogerty
 Long Road Home (album), by Charlie Simpson, 2014
 A Long Road Home, an album by Mickey Newbury, 2002
 The Long Road Home, an album by Danny Worsnop, 2017

See also
 Long Ride Home, a 1988 novel by W. Michael Gear
 The Long Road Back, a 2004 studio album by Peter Andre
 The Long Voyage Home, a 1940 American drama film directed by John Ford
 Long Walk Home (disambiguation)
 Long Way Home (disambiguation)
 The Road Home (disambiguation)